Šarišské Michaľany is a village and municipality in Sabinov District in the Prešov Region of north-eastern Slovakia.

History
In historical records the village was first mentioned in 1248.

Geography
The municipality lies at an elevation of 313 metres and covers an area of 9.333 km². It has a population of about 2698 people.

External links
http://www.statistics.sk/mosmis/eng/run.html
http://www.panoramyslovenska.sk/Panorama/Sarisske-michalany-kostol-sv-michala-interier.html

Villages and municipalities in Sabinov District